Beatriz da Silveira Moreno Batarda (born 1 April 1974) is a British-born Portuguese actress named as one of European films 'Shooting Stars' by European Film Promotion in 1998. She studied design at IADE Institute in Lisbon and trained in acting at Guidhall School of Music and Drama in London.

Biography and career
She was born in London and grew up in Lisbon. She has worked with Lisbon's Cornucópia Company as well as with the Teatro Nacional D.Maria, where she played Berenice, Fedra, Miss Hilda Wangel, Iphygenia and Miss Julie. In 2000, Batarda graduated from London's Guildhall School of Music and Drama with an honours degree in acting. She was awarded a gold medal for Best Actress of the Year and appeared on stage in London in Beyond a Joke by Christopher Morahan and Love Labour's Lost directed by Stephen Unwin. Her first film appearance was in the documentary E Agora Maria? Her credits in film include roles in José Álvaro Morais Peixe Lua and Michael Dowse' It's All Gone Pete Tong. Her television credits include a guest appearance in the US sitcom Relic Hunter, My Family for the BBC and as Annette Forsyte in the remake of Forsyte Saga, Granada Television. She also has directed "Olá e Adeusinho" (Hello and Goodbye) by Athol Fugard at Teatro Cornucopia and "Azul Longe Nas Colinas" (Blue Remembered Hills) by Dennis Potter at Teatro Nacional D. Maria.

Personal life
She was married to pianist Bernardo Sassetti. She is also a first cousin of actress Leonor Silveira.

Filmography
 Bad Living (2023)
 Living Bad (2023)
 Colo (2017)
 Night Train to Lisbon (2013)
 Cisne (2011) – Vera
 Duas Mulheres (2009) – Joana
 How to Draw a Perfect Circle (2009) – Leonor
 Cartaz Cultural (1 episode, 2008)
 Globos de Ouro 2007 (2008) (TV)
 Waking the Dead (2 episodes, Missing Persons: Part 1 and Missing Persons: Part 2, 2008) – Lore Carson
 Cartaz (1 episode, 2007)
 Nadine (2007) – Laura
 Antes de Amanhã (2007)
 Avé Maria (2006) (TV) – Maria
 S.A.C.: Des hommes dans l'ombre (2005) (TV) – Gina
 Alice (2005) – Luísa
 It's All Gone Pete Tong (2004) – Penelope
 A Costa dos Murmúrios (2004) – Evita
 Noite Escura (2004) – Carla Pinto
 Amnesia (2004) (TV) – Lucia Stone
 The Forsyte Saga: To Let (2003) TV mini-series – Annette Forsyte née Lamotte
 Quaresma (2003) – Ana
 The Forsyte Saga (2002) TV mini-series – Annette Forsyte née Lamotte
 Em Volta (2002) – Maria
 Mundo VIP (1 episode, Show nº 246, 2001)
 Doctors (1 episode, A Place of Safety, 2001) – Irena Savich
 My Family (1 episode, Parisian Beauty, 2001) – Sylvie
 Table 12 (1 episode, Magdalena, 2001) – Magdalena
 Relic Hunter (1 episode, Don't Go Into the Woods, 2001) – Vela
 Peixe-Lua (2000) – Maria João
 O Que Te Quero (1998)
 Elles (1997) – Catarina
 Porto Santo (1997) – Mariana
 Dois Dragões (1996) – Luísa
 A Caixa (1994) – Daughter
 Vale Abraão (1993) – Luisona (little girl) / Voice of Young Ema
 Tempos Difíceis (1988)

Awards and nominations
In 2004 she won the Golden Globe at the Golden Globes, Portugal for Best Actress for Quaresma (2003).
In 2005 she won two Golden Globes at the Golden Globes, Portugal for Best Actress for Noite Escura (2004) and for A Costa dos Murmúrios (2004).
In 2008 she won the Golden Globe at the Golden Globes, Portugal for Best Actress for Construtor Solness, where she played Miss Hilda Wangel.
In 2011 she won the SPA award Portugal for Best Actress for Duas Mulheres (2009).

References

External links 
 

1974 births
Living people
Actresses from London
Portuguese film actresses
Golden Globes (Portugal) winners
Commanders of the Order of Prince Henry